Margot Klestil-Löffler (born 4 March 1954 in Dobersberg, Lower Austria) is an Austrian diplomat, former First Lady of Austria from 1998 to 2004, and the widow of Thomas Klestil, the former federal president of Austria. She served as the Austrian Ambassador to the Czech Republic from 2004 to 2009 and Ambassador to Russia 2009 to 2014. She has been serving as Russia envoy under Foreign Minister Karin Kneissl since 2018.

Early life and career
Margot Löffler was born in Dobersberg, Lower Austria. Her parents, Karl and Gerda Löffler, were farmers. She speaks German, English, French, Russian and Czech.

After her diplomatic career in Moscow and Bangkok, Löffler joined Thomas Klestil's office, who was by that time general secretary in the Austrian ministry of foreign affairs. When Thomas Klestil ran for the presidency in 1992, she was managing his election campaign.

First Lady of Austria
During his first term of office, it became public that Klestil and Löffler had a love affair. Klestil divorced his first wife Edith  and married Margot Löffler on 23 December 1998. She became the country's first lady, but continued her job in the foreign ministry, which led to the strange situation that she was ranking higher than her former boss, foreign minister Benita Ferrero-Waldner, on state visits or other official occasions.

When Thomas Klestil died in office on 6 July 2004, both his wives attended the funeral service held in St. Stephen's Cathedral in Vienna. The Roman Catholic Archbishop of Vienna, Cardinal Christoph Schönborn, welcomed Edith Klestil first.

Later career
After her husband's death on 6 July 2004, Klestil-Löffler was appointed Austrian ambassador to the Czech Republic. From December 2009 to December 2014, she was Austrian ambassador to the Russian Federation.

Klestil-Löffler made headlines during the 2014 Sochi winter games when she tried to take a family of Puppies from America's silver medalist Gus Kenworthy.

References 

|-

1954 births
Living people
People from Waidhofen an der Thaya District
Spouses of presidents of Austria
Ambassadors of Austria to the Czech Republic
Ambassadors of Austria to Russia
Austrian women diplomats
Austrian women ambassadors